Northern Pacific-BNSF Minneapolis Rail Bridge is a combination plate girder bridge and truss bridge that spans the Mississippi River in Minneapolis, Minnesota.

It was built in 1884 by the Northern Pacific Railway.  The bridge was originally built in 1884 with five through-trusses.  In 1927, it was renovated with nine plate-girder spans.  In 1963, to provide upstream river navigation, two girder spans and three regular piers were removed to make room for a Warren truss span over the main channel, set on two heavier piers.  This work took almost two years.

The bridge was originally built to provide access to Northern Pacific's yards just north of downtown Minneapolis.  By the 1980s the yards were mostly gone, but the bridge remains as a link to industries located north of downtown that still require rail service by Northern Pacific successor BNSF.

See also
List of crossings of the Upper Mississippi River

References
 

  

Bridges in Minneapolis
Bridges over the Mississippi River
Railroad bridges in Minnesota
Bridges completed in 1884
Northern Pacific Railway
BNSF Railway bridges
Plate girder bridges in the United States
Warren truss bridges in the United States